Caleb James Morris (2 January 1915 – 1985) was a British racewalker. He competed in the 10 km walk at the 1948 Summer Olympics, finishing in fourth place.

References

External links
 

1915 births
1985 deaths
British male racewalkers
Olympic athletes of Great Britain
Athletes (track and field) at the 1948 Summer Olympics
Place of birth missing